"Summer Love" is a song by Swedish pop boyband The Fooo Conspiracy. The song was released as a digital download in Sweden on 29 April 2016 through TEN Music Group. The song peaked at number 54 on the Swedish Singles Chart.

Music video
A video to accompany the release of "Summer Love" was first released onto YouTube on 29 April 2016 at a total length of two minutes and thirty-seven seconds.

Track listing

Chart performance

Weekly charts

Release history

References

2016 singles
2016 songs
Songs written by Andrew Taggart
FO&O songs
Songs written by Shy Martin